Diego Acunzo (born 19 March 1998) is an Italian football player who plays for Serie D club Vastogirardi.

Club career
He made his Serie C debut for Paganese on 4 May 2014 in a game against Salernitana.

References

External links
 
 

1998 births
Sportspeople from the Province of Naples
Living people
Italian footballers
Italian expatriate footballers
Association football midfielders
Paganese Calcio 1926 players
Parma Calcio 1913 players
S.S.C. Napoli players
Fermana F.C. players
A.C. Gozzano players
U.S. Agropoli 1921 players
S.S. Folgore Falciano Calcio players
S.S.D. Correggese Calcio 1948 players
Serie C players
Serie D players
Italian expatriate sportspeople in San Marino
Expatriate footballers in San Marino
Footballers from Campania